Vladislav Ivanovich Matviyenko (born 27 September 1967) is a Russian professional football coach and a former player. As a player, he made his professional debut in the Soviet Second League in 1989 for FC Okean Nakhodka.

References

1967 births
Living people
Sportspeople from Stavropol
Soviet footballers
Russian footballers
FC Okean Nakhodka players
FC Dynamo Stavropol players
Russian Premier League players
FC Lokomotiv Moscow players
PFC Krylia Sovetov Samara players
FC Tekstilshchik Kamyshin players
FC Zhemchuzhina Sochi players
FC Fakel Voronezh players
Russian football managers
FC Okean Nakhodka managers
Association football midfielders